Vladimir Vladimirovich Guriev, (born 1976) is a Russian technology journalist best known for works at Computerra magazine.

Biography 

 1976 — was born
 since 1998 — prints in Computerra
 2001—2003 — editor-in-chief of Computerra Plus
 2003—2007 — senior editor of Computerra
 2007—2008 — editor-in-chief of Computerra
 since 2008 — senior editor of Computerra

Works 
Vladimir Guriev is an author of several hundreds of articles, published in: Computerra, Home Computer, Infobusiness, CIO, Business-magazine. In two years, he was an editor-in-chief of Computerra.

He is also the author of a book of satiric writings.

External links 
 Vladimir Guriev's articles (in Russian)

Living people
1976 births